Bringing Up Bobby is a 2009 Christian direct-to-video comedy film directed by Chris Staron. It was the third film by Glowing Nose, who previously made Pint Size and Between the Walls.

Plot 
Fifteen-year-old Bobby Wyler is challenged to figure out who he is and what he believes, but he doesn't succeed. His parents' will is read, he falls in love and child services take away his best friend. Now he must choose the path for his life before his circumstances choose it for him.

Reception 
Angela Walker of ChristianCinema.com gave the film 4/5 stars, saying, "Parents will enjoy this film because it contains good messages about families and finding your identity in Christ. Some teenagers will enjoy the comedic nature and probably see themselves in the search for identity."

References

External links 
 
 

2009 films
Films about evangelicalism
2009 comedy films
American comedy films
2000s English-language films
2000s American films